Neoeplingia  is a monotypic genus of flowering plant in the family Lamiaceae, first described in 1982. It contains only one known species, Neoeplingia leucophylloides, endemic to the State of Hidalgo in central Mexico.

Neoeplingia leucophylloides has been transferred to the genus Lepechinia, and is now known as Lepechinia leucophylloides.

References 

Lamiaceae
Monotypic Lamiaceae genera
Flora of Hidalgo (state)